Museum of Olympic Glory is a museum in Tashkent, dedicated to the Olympic movement. The main goal of the Museum of Olympic Glory is the organization of exhibitions of exhibits demonstrating achievements of Uzbek athletes at the Olympic Games. The museum presents exhibits in 2088, of which 1005 are available at any time. The museum has a video library, which contains videos of the Olympic Games. Also on display are gold medals for contribution to the development of the sports movement, Islam Karimov sent to the museum.

References 

Museums in Tashkent
Sport in Tashkent
Olympic museums